Harlem Globetrotters is a Saturday morning cartoon produced by Hanna-Barbera and CBS Productions, featuring animated versions of players from the basketball team of the same name.

Broadcast from September 12, 1970 to October 16, 1971 on CBS Saturday Morning, repeated from September 10, 1972 to May 20, 1973 on CBS Sunday Morning, and later re-run from February 4 to September 2, 1978 on NBC as The Go-Go Globetrotters—a two-hour show that also incorporated the animated shorts of a show of the previous year, The CB Bears. (The theme song of the new show hybrid-ed alternate versions of the theme songs of both previous shows.)

The show team members featured fictionalized versions of historical Globetrotters Meadowlark Lemon, Freddie "Curly" Neal, Hubert "Geese" Ausbie, J.C. "Gip" Gipson, Bobby Joe Mason, and Paul "Pablo" Robertson, all in animated form, alongside their fictional bus driver and manager Granny and their dog mascot Dribbles.

The series worked to a formula where the team travels somewhere and typically get involved in a local conflict that leads to one of the Globetrotters proposing a basketball game to settle the issue. To ensure the Globetrotters' defeat, the villains rig the contest; however, before the second half of the contest, the team always finds a way to even the odds, become all but invincible, and win the game.

Voice cast 
The voice cast included:

 Scatman Crothers - George "Meadowlark" Lemon
 Stu Gilliam - Freddie "Curly" Neal
 Johnny Williams - Hubert "Geese" Ausbie
 Richard Elkins - J.C. "Gip" Gipson
 Eddie "Rochester" Anderson - Bobby Joe Mason
 Robert DoQui - Pablo Robertson
 Nancy Wible - "Granny"

Guard Leon Hillard was originally planned to be on the series, but was cut out of the cast prior to the start of production.

Production history 
A total of 22 episodes of Harlem Globetrotters were eventually produced: 16 for the 1970–71 season, and six more for the 1971–72 season. Harlem Globetrotters has a place in history as being the first Saturday morning cartoon to feature a predominately African-American cast. Filmation's The Hardy Boys was the first to feature an African-American character the previous season (1969–70), and Josie and the Pussycats (1970–71), another Hanna-Barbera series which premiered 30 minutes earlier on the same day and network, was the first to feature an African-American female character. Like many other Saturday morning cartoons of the era, the first season utilized a laugh track. By season 2, the full laugh track was replaced by an inferior version created by the studio.

After their show's cancellation, the animated Globetrotters made three appearances on Hanna-Barbera's The New Scooby-Doo Movies in 1972 and 1973. Dribbles, who did not appear on the show, was in the theme song sequence; several references were also made to Granny, who also did not appear on the show. Hanna-Barbera produced a second animated series starring the Globetrotters in 1979 called The Super Globetrotters, this time featuring the players as superheroes. In spring 1999, TV Land aired repeats of Harlem Globetrotters on Saturday mornings as part of its TV Land Super Retrovision Saturdaze lineup. The series has not been rerun since.

The series was a co-production of Hanna-Barbera and CBS Productions (one of the few animated TV series that CBS directly produced). Syndication rights were originally held by Viacom Enterprises and later Paramount Domestic Television, formerly owned by CBS as its syndication arm. They are currently held by CBS Media Ventures.

Episodes

Season 1 (1970–1971)

Season 2 (1971–1972) 
 HG-17. "A Pearl of a Game" (9/11/1971)
 HG-18. "Nothing to Moon About" (9/18/1971)
 HG-19. "Pardon My Magic" (9/25/1971)
 HG-20. "Granny's Royal Ruckus" (10/2/1971)
 HG-21. "Soccer to Me" (10/9/1971)
 HG-22. "Jungle Jitters" (10/16/1971)

In other media

Soundtrack LP 
A soundtrack album, The Globetrotters, was produced by Jeff Barry and released in 1970 by Kirshner Records (Kirshner #KES-106, distributed by RCA Records), which featured tunes heard in episodes of the series (during the basketball game sequences). Don Kirshner served as music supervisor for both the series and the record. Two singles were generated from this onetime release, a cover of the Neil Sedaka tune "Rainy Day Bells" with former Cadillac J.R. Bailey on lead vocals, followed by three non-album singles. Jimmy Radcliffe produced, with Wally Gold, and provided the vocals on "Duke Of Earl", "Everybody's Got Hot Pants" from the first non-album single and co-wrote and produced "Everybody Needs Love" from the second as well providing a number of songs and recordings for the series.

Globetrotter frontman Meadowlark Lemon was the only member of the team to be actually involved with the project, adding occasional background vocals to some tracks.

Track list for The Globetrotters 
(Side 1)
 The Globetrotter's Theme    (Jeff Barry) – 0:41
 Globetrottin'    (Barry) – 2:19
 Bouncin' All Over the World    (Neil Sedaka and Howard Greenfield) – 3:01
 Sneaky Pete    (Rudy Clark, J.R. Bailey, and K. Williams) – 2:45
 Marathon Mary    (Sedaka and Greenfield) – 3:06
 River Queen    (Sedaka and Greenfield) – 3:06
 House Party    (Clark, Bailey, and Williams) – 3:00
(Side 2)
 Gravy    (Clark, Bailey, and Williams) – 3:19
 Meadowlark    (Sedaka and Greenfield) – 2:22
 Lillia Peabody    (Clark, Bailey, and Williams) – 2:56
 Put a Little Meat On Your Bones, Lucinda    (Sedaka and Greenfield) – 3:00
 Rainy Day Bells    (Sedaka and Greenfield)  – 3:02
 Cheer Me Up    (Jeff Barry, Ron Dante, and J. Carr) – 2:22

Commercial singles (1970) 
 "Cheer Me Up" b/w "Gravy" (Kirshner # 63-5006)
 "Rainy Day Bells" b/w "Meadowlark" (Kirshner #63-5008)

Non-album singles (1971) 
 "Duke of Earl" b/w "Everybody's Got Hot Pants" (Kirshner #63-5012)
 "Everybody Needs Love" (Jimmy Radcliffe and Phil Stern) b/w "ESP" (Kirshner #63-5016)
 "Sweet Georgia Brown" b/w "Bye Bye Blues" (Harlem Globetrotters #45-HGT-300 A/B)

Gold Key Comics series 
In April 1972, Gold Key Comics launched a comic adaptation of the Harlem Globetrotters animated series; their first comic book appearance was in issue #8 of Gold Key's Hanna-Barbera Fun-In published in July 1971. Several stories in early issues were based on episodes of the TV show. The comic book series lasted for four years and 12 issues through January 1975.

References

External links 
 
 
 Harlem Globetrotters according to Wingnut

Cultural depictions of the Harlem Globetrotters
1970s American animated television series
1970s American black cartoons
1970 American television series debuts
1972 American television series endings
CBS original programming
Animation based on real people
Television series by Hanna-Barbera
Television series by CBS Studios
English-language television shows
American children's animated comedy television series
American children's animated sports television series
Basketball television series